Glen Bartlett (born 6 October 1964) was the chairman of the Melbourne Football Club and a former Australian rules footballer who played for the West Coast Eagles in the Victorian Football League (VFL) and East Perth in the West Australian Football League (WAFL).

Biography 
Bartlett was used mostly as a key forward at East Perth. He joined West Coast for their inaugural VFL season in 1987 and won their 'Best Clubman' award after playing four games for the year. Despite this he was delisted and returned to East Perth with whom he kicked 69 goals in 1990 to win the Bernie Naylor Medal. He received another chance to play in the VFL when he was recruited by the Brisbane Bears, but Bartlett refused to move from Perth. A trade was considered with Melbourne Football Club for a full-forward; however the Demons went for Allen Jakovich instead.

Bartlett spent four years as captain of East Perth before retiring after achieving life membership at the age of 26. Bartlett represented his state in an interstate match against South Australia in 1990, kicking three goals from full-forward in the first half.

Bartlett retired to concentrate on his law studies becoming a lawyer in 1996, a partner in the workplace relations team of Clayton Utz in 2000 founding the Perth practice. In 2008 Bartlett moved to Melbourne and was appointed Managing Partner of Clayton Utz Melbourne in late 2010 and served until 2013. He was appointed to the Melbourne Football Club board during the 2013 season, following Don McLardy's resignation. On 16 August 2013, Bartlett was named as the president of the Melbourne Football Club.

References

Holmesby, Russell and Main, Jim (2007). The Encyclopedia of AFL Footballers. 7th ed. Melbourne: Bas Publishing.

External links

1964 births
Living people
West Coast Eagles players
East Perth Football Club players
Melbourne Football Club administrators
Australian rules footballers from Western Australia